Hidden Lake Academy was a therapeutic boarding school in Dahlonega, Georgia, United States, in operation from 1994 until 2011. In 2006, it was the subject of legal action over accreditation. The school filed bankruptcy in 2009 and shut down in 2011.

History
The school was founded in 1994 by Dr. Leonard Buccelatto in Dahlonega, Georgia. It was intended to "fill the need for a specialty school to fill the gap between services of residential treatment centers and traditional boarding schools."

In January 2009, after the bankruptcy hearing, a new branch was started under the name Creekside Wilderness Academy. It shared the same address and facilities with Hidden Lake Academy. In July 2011, the school closed.

About the program
New students had typically struggled with homework, depression, anger management, or various addictions. Some students were from outside the United States. The student population ranged from about 15 to 200.  Hidden Lake Academy was accredited by the Southern Association of Colleges and Schools (SACS), the Southern Association of Independent Schools (SAIS), and the Georgia Accreditation Commission (GAC).

The staff recommended that most of the students attend small colleges or boarding schools, although a few attended larger universities or went back to ordinary high schools, against the school's recommendations.

Books were screened, and students were not allowed to possess any literature containing sex or drug references/pictures. Magazines, newspapers, and journals were also screened, and any inappropriate articles were cut out to allow the student to have reading material without negative influences. Incoming and outgoing mail were no longer screened by staff, but some letters were not permitted if they were from friends. The school did not always let students know when they received letters.

Peer groups, the school's method of group therapy, started with about ten students and one counselor. Students arrived at all times during the school year and were expected to stay for 18 months. During that time the students received an education tailored for those with learning differences and/or disabilities, and which included group therapy. Like other behavioral modification institutions dedicated to improving behaviors, Hidden Lake Academy put students through different developmental tracks.

Lawsuit

2006 petition for lawsuit
On September 11, 2006, three plaintiffs filed a petition for a federal class action lawsuit (Civil action No. 2:06-CV-0146-WCO) against Hidden Lake Academy and Len Buccellato on behalf of parents of students who attended the school since January 1, 2000. The case was Jill Ryan, Ron Ryan, Doff Meyer, Robin Brecker, and on behalf of others similarly situated vs. Hidden Lake Academy, Inc; HLA, Inc.; Hidden Lake Foundation, Inc.; and Dr. Leonard Buccellato.

The plaintiffs were clients of Berger & Montague and were represented by Gorby, Reeves, and Peters. The plaintiffs charged that Hidden Lake Academy "employed a number of uncertified teachers and unqualified counseling staff; did not employ at times any licensed learning disability specialist or a registered or properly licensed nurse; allowed unlicensed staff such as secretaries to dispense to students prescription medication; enrolled a number court-ordered, violent and severely disturbed children; and overbilled families for a number of items and incidental charges, among other things."

Hidden Lake Academy defense attorney Martin Quirk responded by saying that it was the result of parents who, after withdrawing their children, were unhappy with not being able to get a refund for the school's tuition. Len Buccellato responded with a letter to parents and consultants stating that "the feelings of the staff at the meetings we have had have ranged from pain as deep as mine to absolute rage that anyone could say those things in light of the countless numbers of students and families we have worked with whose lives have been put back on a positive and productive track... we have been advised by counsel not to comment on the specific allegations at this point and to allow our attorneys respond to the allegations in due course."

Matt Aiken, a former staff member at Hidden Lake, wrote a front-page article about the lawsuit in the local newspaper, The Dahlonega Nugget. Various letters to the editor were later published. Diane Stephenson, a laywoman highly involved in the local Unitarian Universalist Church, wrote of Hidden Lake Academy's various contributions to the local community. Reverend Barry Bailey, who often visits the school to teach students about local Indian beliefs, wrote a letter saying "When those [plaintiff's] lawyers made their blistering attack they conveniently forgot that Hidden Lake is a last chance boarding academy that offers objectively-defined teenagers an alternative to prison. Such a school is inherent with risks and the possibility of violence and retaliation."

Headmaster Charles Cates also responded to the article, saying that Hidden Lake Academy was "considered the premier institute in this area and has a high success rate... [and the lawsuit] apparently relies on erroneous information provided by disgruntled ex-employees." Clarke Poole also sent a letter to the editor. Poole was once the senior admissions coordinator at Hidden Lake. Although he is not a psychotherapist, he became concerned about the admission of students whom he felt to be dangerous and voiced his concerns to his colleagues. He felt that his "concerns were dismissed and I was routinely admonished for raising them. In February 2006, when I was denied a meeting with school management to address issues of grave concern related to the safety of students, it was ethically incumbent upon me to resign." In his letter to the Nugget, besides outlining his record of involvement with the school, he also attempted to dispel rumors that he was the Admissions Director (as opposed to the Coordinator) and that he was involved with the lawsuit.

Hidden Lake Academy replied to the lawsuit, requesting that it be dismissed by the court and filed a counterclaim claiming that the plaintiffs should be obligated to reimburse the school for losses incurred by its involvement in the lawsuit. A hearing to determine if the case qualifies as a class action lawsuit was held on January 31, 2007, and on August 15, 2007, Federal Judge William O'Kelley ruled against the plaintiffs by denying the petition for class action without prejudice.  However, on September 9, 2008, Judge Kelly found that the prerequisites for a class action were met and certified the class for settlement purposes.

Settlement of lawsuit 
Much of the school's financial troubles stems from a September 2006 lawsuit accusing the school's founder, Len Buccellato, of multiple ethics oversights, including the employment of unqualified instructors, knowingly accepting dangerous students and misuse of school funds. The suit was blamed for a significant drop in enrollment in the ensuing months. Between the time the suit was filed and the following August, the boarding school lost about 100 students, reported headmaster Joe Stapp.

In August 2007, federal judge William C. O'Kelley denied a potential class action suit against the academy based on the fact the school agreed to settle out of court for a reported $400,000. This settlement was to be paid by December 31, 2008.

On January 8, 2009, the attorney for those to be paid in the settlement filed a motion for the court to force Hidden Lake Academy to pay. On January 19, the school's attorney filed a response to the Motion to Enforce Settlement and Judgment, citing a "drastic decrease in the student body of Hidden Lake Academy subsequent to, and in my opinion, caused by the filing" of the complaint against the school, "and a continuing barrage of negative emails to educational consultants who in the past referred prospective students" to the school, an affidavit attached to the motion states.

The affidavit also states that Buccellato and the school have attempted to obtain a new loan to pay off both its lien holder (BB&T) and the $400,000 owed to plaintiffs from the original judgment.

The lawsuit was finally resolved when the settlement was paid in full on June 30, 2009.

Hidden Lake saw Chapter 11 as a chance to regroup. School owner Buccelatto called the school's opponents "vicious and unrelenting... It became very evident that the goal of the people involved was to discredit, and to ultimately close the school... creating as large a financial burden to the school as possible by attacking [our] referral sources through fear and intimidation. It would be a gross understatement to say that these events did not have an impact on the school. The financial reality is one the school is still reeling from."

Notable alumni 
 Dash Snow, artist

References

Therapeutic community
Schools in Lumpkin County, Georgia
Private schools in Georgia (U.S. state)
Schools accredited by the Southern Association of Colleges and Schools
Therapeutic boarding schools in the United States